The yellow-winged darter (Sympetrum flaveolum) is a dragonfly found in Europe and mid and northern China. Breeding is confined to stagnant water, usually in peat bogs. Although not resident in the United Kingdom it occasionally migrates there in some numbers. Such 'Invasion Years' occurred in 1906, 1926, 1945, 1953, and 1995. On each occasion a small breeding colony appeared, but they have invariably died out after a few years.

An almost unmistakable darter, red-bodied in the male, with both sexes having large amounts of saffron-yellow colouration to the basal area of each wing, which is particularly noticeable on the hind-wings. Other Sympetrum species may have limited yellow-orange colouration near the extreme wing-bases, especially in females, but never so extensively as in this species.

Sites which are likely to attract this species have thick rushy margins. The yellow-winged darter tends to make quite short flights when settled at a site, and frequently perches quite low down on vegetation.

The yellow-winged darter has bred but is not established in the UK. It has occurred in Cumbria as single individuals on very few occasions. The most recent record was at Killington Reservoir in August 1995.

In Southern Europe, the nymphs of this dragonfly live in oligotrophic lakes with submerged vegetation, at high altitudes. Temperature and vegetation of these habitats are likely to be altered by Climate Change. As an abundant predator the species has an important role in food webs of high altitude lakes. Its disappearance will lead to changes in food webs.

References

External Links 

Libellulidae
Dragonflies of Europe
Insects described in 1758
Taxa named by Carl Linnaeus